is operated by JR West in Yamaguchi City, and is served by the Yamaguchi Line, which connects the station to Shin-Yamaguchi Station, a stop of the Sanyō Shinkansen. And the limited express Super Oki and the rapid sightseeing train SL Yamaguchi steam train also stop here.

History

 February 20, 1913: Station opens
 April 1, 1987: Station operation is taken over by JR West after privatization of Japanese National Railways

Layout
The station has three regular tracks.
Each of the platforms is connected by an overpass at end of the station.

Platforms

Adjacent stations
West Japan Railway (JR West)
 █ Yamaguchi Line
 □Limited Express "Super Oki"
 Yudaonsen - Yamaguchi - Mitani
 □Rapid "Commuter Liner"
 Yudaonsen - Yamaguchi (- Kami-Yamaguchi)
 ■Local
 Yudaonsen - Yamaguchi - Kami-Yamaguchi

External links
 JR West

Railway stations in Japan opened in 1913
Railway stations in Yamaguchi Prefecture
Stations of West Japan Railway Company